Bayındır station is a railway station in the town of Bayındır, Turkey. The station is serviced by the Turkish State Railways. 8 trains service the station going eastbound to Ödemiş or Tire and westbound to İzmir. The station was built in 1883 by the Oriental Railway Company and taken over by the Turkish State Railways in 1935.

References

Railway stations in İzmir Province
Railway stations opened in 1883
1883 establishments in the Ottoman Empire
Bayındır District